Horologica semipicta is a species of minute sea snail, a marine gastropod mollusc in the family Cerithiopsidae. 

The species was described by Gould in 1861.

References

 Cecalupo A. & Perugia I. (2013) The Cerithiopsidae (Caenogastropoda: Triphoroidea) of Espiritu Santo - Vanuatu (South Pacific Ocean). Published by the authors, Milano. 253 pp.

Gastropods described in 1861
Cerithiopsidae